Cody Charles Arnoux (born April 13, 1988 in Stony Brook, New York) is an American soccer player.

His previous clubs include NCAA affiliated Atlantic Coast Conference University team Wake Forest Demon Deacons, USL Premier Development League club side Carolina Dynamo and English Premier League club Everton.

Career

College and amateur
Arnoux attended New Hanover High School in Wilmington, North Carolina, played club soccer for the Cape Fear Breakers, and played college soccer at Wake Forest University from 2006 to 2008, where he made 64 appearances and scored 33 goals in the NCAA Division I Atlantic Coast Conference. He scored fourteen goals in sixteen appearances in three campaigns for Carolina Dynamo in the USL Premier Development League

Professional
Arnoux signed for English Premier League club Everton on a one-year contract in August 2009 following a trial in March 2009 which also saw compatriot Anton Peterlin sign for the Liverpool-based club. In March 2010, he attended a trial with Scottish Premier League team Motherwell. He was released by Everton at the end of the 2009–10 season, having played seven times for the reserve team, and he went on trial with League One team Plymouth Argyle.

Arnoux signed for USSF Division 2 club Vancouver Whitecaps on August 18, 2010, and made his first professional appearance for the team the following day, August 19, 2010, in a game against FC Tampa Bay. He scored his first professional goal on October 2, 2010 in Vancouver's last game of the 2010 USSFD2 regular season, a 2-2 tie with the Portland Timbers.

Prior to the 2011 season MLS rejected Arnoux's contract with the Whitecaps as they feel that both parties attempted to bypass the draft process.  Since Arnoux was signed for 2011 the Whitecaps have assigned him to train for their PDL team.

On 8 February 2011 he was released from his contract and the following day he signed with Major League Soccer. On 11 February he was assigned to Real Salt Lake in a lottery draft.

After being released by Salt Lake in June 2012, Arnoux signed with USL Pro club Wilmington Hammerheads on July 5, 2012.

International
Arnoux has been capped for the United States at under-15 and under-18 level.

Personal life
Arnoux holds an Italian passport.

Achievements

Wake Forest Demon Deacons
NCAA Division I Men's Soccer Championship: 2007

Career statistics

References

External links

Vancouver Whitecaps profile

1988 births
Living people
American soccer players
Association football forwards
North Carolina Fusion U23 players
Everton F.C. players
Major League Soccer players
People from Stony Brook, New York
Real Salt Lake players
Soccer players from New York (state)
Sportspeople from Suffolk County, New York
United States men's youth international soccer players
USL Championship players
USL League Two players
USSF Division 2 Professional League players
Vancouver Whitecaps (1986–2010) players
Wake Forest Demon Deacons men's soccer players
Wilmington Hammerheads FC players
New Hanover High School alumni